Hostile is a 2022 documentary film directed by Sonita Gale. The film explores the UK government’s ‘hostile environment’ immigration policy, first articulated in 2012 under the Cameron administration. The film premiered on 29 October 2021 at the Raindance Film Festival.

Synopsis 

The film delves into the UK government’s ‘hostile environment’ policy. Told through the stories of four participants from Black and Asian backgrounds, the film explores how the lives of international students, members of the Windrush generation and so-called ‘Highly-Skilled Migrants’ have been affected. 

The ‘hostile environment’ policy strategy was first employed by Theresa May in 2012, while she was Home Secretary for David Cameron’s government. Speaking at the time, May stated that ‘The aim is to create, here in Britain, a really hostile environment for illegal immigrants.’

The film shows Farrukh Sair, an NHS IT engineer whose repeated visa applications have left him heavily in debt. Anthony Bryan, a member of the Windrush generation, who was denied his rights to live and work in the UK despite having lived in the country since he was 8. Daksha and Paresh, who started a Community Response Kitchen to feed members of the migrant community struggling to buy food. International students and a teacher also share their experiences anonymously. 

A key focus of the film is NRPF, or no recourse to public funds. Under section 115 of the Immigration and Aslyum Act 1999, a person who is subject to immigration control cannot claim public funds such as benefits or housing assistance. Hostile profiled the impact of this policy, and the particular problems that arose following the outbreak of the coronavirus pandemic when many in the migrant community found themselves unable to work but were not eligible for Universal Credit, Disability Living Allowance, Child Benefit and Housing Benefit, among other things. 

The director has said that the main aim of the film was ‘to build… bridges and to start dialogue… about our similarities and our differences.’

Gale has also discussed her upbringing and how this influenced the making of Hostile. As one of ten children born to a couple who left India for Wolverhampton following Partition, she strove to put migration and social change at the centre of her storytelling.

Production 

The film was written, directed and produced by London-based filmmaker Sonita Gale. Filming commenced shortly after the outbreak of the covid-19 pandemic. Gale has stated that she originally intended the film to look at the treatment of migrant workers, but that once she started filming she shifted her focus to the ‘hostile environment’ policy more broadly.

Nitin Sawhney and Charlotte Fisher were the film’s Executive Producers, with Sawhney also providing music for the film.

Release 

The film first premiered at Raindance Film Festival on 29 October 2021. 

Distribution rights were acquired by BFI Player, VGTV, SBS, Public Media Group of Southern California, and Rialto. The film is currently available to stream on BFI Player. 

The film was released to the general public on 21 January 21 2022, screening at Picturehouse Cinemas and other independent cinemas across the UK, including BFI Southbank, Bertha Doc House and Curzon.

Hostile director Sonita Gale has also participated in many Q&As at screenings, hosted by figures including Nitin Sawhney, Jason Solomons, Ursula Macfarlane director of Untouchable, UK Director of Human Rights Watch Yasmine Ahmed and South African politician and activist Andrew Feinstein.

Reception

Critical Response 
The film was praised by critics. Awarding it four stars, the Guardian’s Peter Bradshaw called Hostile a ‘powerful film’ and ‘interesting and highly pertinent’, while Time Out’s Whelan Barzey described it as ‘a cry from the heart for a more compassionate attitude towards immigrants.’

Amelia Gentleman, a Guardian journalist who has reported extensively on the Windrush scandal, wrote that ‘Gale’s portrayal of Sair’s predicament is so clear and powerful that the pointless human damage wrought by these complexities is laid bare.’

The New European’s Jason Solomons wrote ‘what’s interesting about Hostile is its desire to dig deeper. Not content with highlighting the obvious indignities and cruelties of how the policy operates and how it leaves victims in desperate circumstances, but into why it is there in the first place.’

Mariella Frostrup of Times Radio called it ‘a film that demands our attention’ and Abiba Coulibaly of Sight and Sound praised it as ‘one of the most comprehensive accounts of how we arrived at our current immigration system legislation.’

Journalist and former Channel 4 News presenter Jon Snow tweeted his approval of the film, calling it 'important and revealing.'

Accolades 

|-
! scope="row" | 2022
| Outstanding Debut By A British Writer, Director or Producer
| BAFTA 
| 
| 
|
|-
! scope="row" | 2021
| Best Debut Director
| BIFA 
| 
| 
|
|-
! scope="row" | 2021
| Best Documentary
| BIFA 
| 
| 
|
|-
! scope="row" | 2021
| Raindance Discovery Award
| BIFA 
| 
| 
|
|-
! scope="row" | 2022
| Best Documentary Feature 
| Filmocracy Fest 2022
| 
| 
|
|-
! scope="row" | 2022
| Best Documentary Feature 
| The Roxbury International Film Festival 2022
| 
| 
|
|-
! scope="row" | 2021
| Best Documentary Feature 
| South London Film Festival 2021
| 
| 
|
|-
! scope="row" | 2022
| Award of Excellence Special Mention
| The Impact DOCS Awards 2022
| 
| 
|
|-
! scope="row" | 2022
| Best Indie Feature Film Honourable Mention  
| The Best Indie Film Awards 2022
| 
| 
|
|-
! scope="row" | 2022
| Supreme Award  
| Melbourne Documentary Film Festival 2022
| 
| Finalist 
|
|-
! scope="row" | 2022
| Best Director - International  
| Melbourne Documentary Film Festival 2022
| 
| Finalist 
|
|-
! scope="row" | 2022
| Finalist - Official Selection 
| Catalina Film Festival 2022
| 
| Finalist 
|
|-
! scope="row" | 2022
| Best Documentary 
| British Urban Film Festival 2022
| 
| Finalist 
|
|-
! scope="row" | 2022
| Official Selection 
| Take One Action Film Festival 
|
| 
|
|-
! scope="row" | 2022
| Official Selection 
| Naples Human Rights Film Festival 2022
|
|
|
|-
! scope="row" | 2022
| Official Selection 
| Red Carpet Human Rights Film Festival 2022
|
|
|
|-
! scope="row" | 2022
| Official Selection 
| DOCtober 2022
|
|
|
|-
! scope="row" | 2022
| Official Selection 
| Festival des Libertés 2022
|
|
|
|-
! scope="row" | 2022
| Official Selection 
| New Generations Independent Indian Film Festival 2022
|
|
|
|-
! scope="row" | 2022
| Official Selection 
| UK Asian Film Festival 2022
|
|
|
|-
! scope="row" | 2022
| Official Selection 
| Budapest Movie Awards 2022 
|
|
|
|-
! scope="row" | 2022
| Official Selection 
| Manchester Film Awards 2022
|
|
|
|-
! scope="row" | 2022
| Official Selection 
| ZagrebDox 2022
|
|
|
|-
! scope="row" | 2022
| Official Selection 
| NorthwestFest International Documentary Film Festival 2022
|
|
|
|-
! scope="row" | 2022
| Official Selection 
|Berlin Lift-Off Film Festival 2022 
|
|
|
|-
! scope="row" | 2021
| Official Selection 
|Cambridge Film Festival 2021 
|
|
|
|-
! scope="row" | 2021
| Official Selection 
|London Migration Film Festival 2021
|
|
|
|-
! scope="row" | 2021
| Official Selection 
|Raindance Film Festival 2021 
|
|
|
|-
! scope="row" | 2021
| Official Selection 
|Global Health Film Festival 2022
|
|
|

|-

References 

2022 documentary films
2020s English-language films